In mathematics, a rank ring is a ring with a real-valued rank function behaving like the rank of an endomorphism.  introduced rank rings in his work on continuous geometry, and showed that the ring associated to a continuous geometry is a rank ring.

Definition

 defined a ring to be a rank ring if it is regular and has a real-valued rank function R with the following properties:
0 ≤ R(a) ≤ 1 for all a
R(a) = 0 if and only if a = 0
R(1) = 1
R(ab) ≤ R(a), R(ab) ≤ R(b)
If e2 = e, f2 = f, ef = fe = 0 then R(e + f) = R(e) + R(f).

References

Ring theory